Saud bin Fahd Al Saud (born 8 October 1950) is a Saudi Arabian businessman and the former vice president of general intelligence directorate. He is a member of the House of Saud.

Early life and education
Prince Saud was born on 8 October 1950. He is the son of King Fahd. His mother, Alanoud bint Abdulaziz bin Musaed, was from the Jiluwi branch of the Al Saud whose members intermarried with the Al Saud. She died of kidney failure in Santa Barbara in March 1999 after a long period of treatment in Los Angeles at the age of 76.

Prince Saud's full-brothers are Faisal bin Fahd, Mohammed bin Fahd, Sultan bin Fahd and Khaled bin Fahd. His full-sister was Latifa bint Fahd.

Prince Saud holds a bachelor's degree in economics which he received in the United States.

Career
Saud bin Fahd served as vice president of general intelligence from 1985 to October 2005. Therefore, he was deputy to Turki bin Faisal and then to Nawwaf bin Abdulaziz. Saud bin Fahd has various business activities and is the founding member of the Faisal Bank in Egypt.

Personal life
Saud bin Fahd is married to Madawi bint Musaed bin Abdulaziz Al Saud and has four children, two daughters and two sons. One of his daughters married Mansour bin Muqrin, son of Muqrin bin Abdulaziz, the former Crown Prince of Saudi Arabia. Saud bin Fahd is known for his religious observance.

References

Saud
Saud
Saud
Saud
1950 births
Children of Fahd of Saudi Arabia
Living people
Saud